Eliza Otis may refer to:
 Eliza Ann Otis, American poet, journalist, and philanthropist
 Eliza Henderson Boardman Otis, American philanthropist and novelist